Shepherd University is located in Los Angeles, CA. The institution consists of five schools; the School of Digital Arts, the Cornel School of Contemporary Music, the School of Nursing, the School of Theology and for international students, an ESL department. Shepherd University was established in 1999, and since its foundation has grown rapidly through its strategy of practical learning, focused education and ambition for excellence.

The Cornel School of Contemporary Music (CSCM) is a school of contemporary music at Shepherd University located in Los Angeles, California. CSCM offers Music Certificates, Bachelor of Music and Master of Music degree in Contemporary Performance, Contemporary Composition, Film Scoring, Songwriting, Music Production, and Contemporary Christian & Worship Music.

Accreditation
The Cornel School of Contemporary Music (CSCM) is accredited by the Accrediting Council for Independent Colleges and Schools (ACICS), and was awarded WASC (Western Association of Schools and Colleges) Candidacy.

Academics
Majors offered at CSCM are Contemporary Performance (in Piano/Keyboard, Bass, Drums, Guitar, Vocal, or Woodwind), Contemporary Composition, Film Scoring, Songwriting, Music Production, and Contemporary Christian & Worship Music.

Notable faculty 
 Abraham Laboriel (Bass Guitar)
 Otmaro Ruiz (Piano)
 Sara Gazarek (Voice)
 Tommy Walker (CCM/Worship)
 Oscar Hernandez (Piano, Performance)
 Michael Bradford (Music Production)

References

 Approvals and Accreditations

External links
 
 Shepherd University official site

Music schools in California
Educational institutions established in 1999
1999 establishments in California